Arthur Ernest Sellers (23 February 1876 — 9 February 1949) was an English-born Scottish first-class cricketer and groundskeeper.

Sellers was born at Mansfield in February 1876. He moved to Scotland as a young child when his father, Tom Sellers, moved there to take up a groundskeeping job at The Grange Club. A club cricketer for Carlton Cricket Club, he played two first-class matches for Scotland in 1920 and 1922; he was a late debutant in first-class cricket, being aged 44 in 1920. His appearance in 1920 came against Ireland at Edinburgh, with his 1922 appearance coming against the Marylebone Cricket Club at Lord's. Playing as a right-arm medium pace bowler in the Scottish side, Sellers took 8 wickets at an average of 19.12;. he took one five wicket haul, with figures of 5 for 22 against Ireland. A knee injury later ended his club career while he was still engaged as a professional at Carlton.

Outside of cricket, Sellers was a groundsman. He was employed by Scottish Rugby Union and was responsible for preparing all of Scotland's home international rugby pitches at Inverleith and Murrayfield. Sellers died at Edinburgh in February 1949.

References

External links
 

1876 births
1949 deaths
People from Mansfield
Scottish people of English descent
Scottish cricketers
Groundskeepers